"I Like Girls" is a song by American rapper PnB Rock featuring fellow American rapper Lil Skies. Produced by Hitmaka, Christopher Dotson, Ayo, and Keyz, it was released on March 21, 2019 as the third single from Rock's second studio album TrapStar Turnt PopStar (2019).

Background
PnB Rock premiered the song on Zane Lowe's Beats 1 show. In regards to the song, he said, "It's pretty much universal, you know what I'm saying? Everybody like girls." In that interview, he also praised Lil Skies' vocabulary in music when talking about the collaboration.

Critical reception
Aron A. of HotNewHipHop gave the song a "Very Hottt" rating and called it "an uptempo, bass-heavy banger for a certified anthem for freaky girls."

Music video
A music video was released alongside the single. It was directed by Majik Films.

Charts

Certifications

References

2019 singles
2019 songs
PnB Rock songs
Lil Skies songs
Songs written by PnB Rock
Songs written by Lil Skies
Songs written by Hitmaka
Songs written by Christopher Dotson
Songs written by Keyz (producer)
Song recordings produced by Yung Berg
Song recordings produced by Keyz (producer)
Atlantic Records singles
Songs written by Mike Will Made It